Stephen Stromberg is a member of the Washington Post editorial board. He was part of the Washington Post team that won the 2022 Pulitzer Prize in Public Service. His writing focuses on U.S. politics and government, healthcare, environment and energy.

An Eagle Scout, he was raised Mormon and has written about Mormonism. While he primarily covers domestic politics and policy, he has also occasionally covered other areas of his interest, including sumo wrestling and the television shows Rick and Morty and Star Trek. He is a Washington Nationals fan. Prior to writing for The Washington Post, he covered American politics for The Economist.

He is married to Post humor columnist Alexandra Petri and lives in Washington, D.C.. He grew up in Los Angeles before attending Harvard University where he was editorial chair of the Harvard Crimson. Afterwards, he attended Oxford University, where he was executive editor of the Oxonian Review.

References 

The Washington Post people
Year of birth missing (living people)
Living people
Alumni of the University of Oxford
Harvard University alumni
Writers from Los Angeles
Latter Day Saints from California
Journalists from California
American expatriates in the United Kingdom
The Harvard Crimson people
21st-century American male writers
21st-century American journalists
American male journalists